The Yellomundee Regional Park is a protected regional park that is located on the eastern escarpment of the Blue Mountains region of New South Wales in eastern Australia. The park is situated in a region that is part of the Great Escarpment formed by the orogeny that created the Great Dividing Range.

Location and features

Yellomundee Regional Park is distinct in that only about one fifth of the land has been modified and it contains large areas of natural bushland as well as cultural and historical sites. The park protects areas of alluvial and riverine plant communities.

See also

 Protected areas of New South Wales

References

External links
  List of animals recorded in the park

Parks and reserves of the Blue Mountains (New South Wales)
Regional parks in New South Wales
2000 establishments in Australia
Protected areas established in 2000
City of Hawkesbury
City of Blue Mountains
City of Penrith